is a Japanese tennis player.

She has career-high WTA rankings of 322 in singles, achieved on 24 February 2020, and 210 in doubles, reached on 16 March 2020, and has won one singles title and eight doubles titles on the ITF Women's Circuit.

Hayashi made her main-draw debut on the WTA Tour at the 2017 Japan Women's Open, where she received a wildcard alongside Momoko Kobori for the doubles competition.

ITF Circuit finals

Singles: 2 (1 title, 1 runner–up)

Doubles: 21 (9 titles, 13 runner–ups)

External links
 
 

1994 births
Living people
People from Sabae, Fukui
Japanese female tennis players
Sportspeople from Fukui Prefecture
Universiade medalists in tennis
Tennis players at the 2018 Asian Games
Medalists at the 2018 Asian Games
Asian Games medalists in tennis
Asian Games bronze medalists for Japan
Universiade gold medalists for Japan
Universiade bronze medalists for Japan
Medalists at the 2015 Summer Universiade
Medalists at the 2017 Summer Universiade
21st-century Japanese women